Harold Raymond Pollock (7 September 1909 – 10 January 1984) was a New Zealand rugby union player. He was a utility back, although his preferred position was at fullback. Pollock represented  at a provincial level, and was a member of the New Zealand national side, the All Blacks, in 1932 and 1936. He played eight matches for the All Blacks including five internationals, scoring 41 points in all.

References

1909 births
1984 deaths
People from Petone
Rugby union players from Lower Hutt
New Zealand rugby union players
New Zealand international rugby union players
Wellington rugby union players
Rugby union fullbacks
Rugby union centres
Rugby union fly-halves